Fligely Fjord is a fjord in King Christian X Land, East Greenland. Administratively it is part of the Northeast Greenland National Park zone.

History
The fjord was first surveyed by Carl Koldewey during the 1869–70 Second German North Polar Expedition. Koldewey named it after Austrian cartographer Field Marshal August von Fligely (1810–1879).

There are a number of hunter cabins in the shores of the fjord.

Geography
Fligely Fjord is a marine channel with a fjord structure that stretches west of Kuhn Island and north of the mouth area of Lindeman Fjord. It forms the western shore of the island and to the west the eastern shore of Thomas Thomsen Land. The mouth of Grandjean Fjord lies west of the fjord's northern end.

See also
List of fjords of Greenland

References

External links
 Scott Polar Research Institute, Cambridge - Museum catalogue
 Field report from Greenland: basin analysis in high gear

Fjords of Greenland